The River Nadder is a tributary of the River Avon, flowing in south Wiltshire, England.

Course
The river flows north from Ludwell to West End where it is joined by the Ferne Brook, close to the Lower Coombe and Ferne Brook Meadows site of special scientific interest (SSSI). At Wardour it is joined by the River Sem. The river then flows east through Tisbury, where it is joined by the Fonthill Brook, and then onto Barford St Martin and Burcombe before reaching Wilton. Near Quidhampton, the Wylye joins from the north. After passing Harnham, the Nadder joins the Avon near Salisbury Cathedral.

Water quality
The Environment Agency measures the water quality of the river systems in England. Each is given an overall ecological status, which may be one of five levels: high, good, moderate, poor and bad. There are several components that are used to determine this, including biological status, which looks at the quantity and varieties of invertebrates, angiosperms and fish. Chemical status, which compares the concentrations of various chemicals against known safe concentrations, is rated good or fail.

Water quality of the River Nadder in 2019:

Image gallery

References

External links
Discover Nadder - Cranborne Chase AONB

Nadder
2Nadder